4-Methylmethamphetamine (4-MMA) or Mephedrine, is a putative stimulant and entactogen drug of the amphetamine class. It is the β-deketo analogue of mephedrone.

See also 
 4-Methylamphetamine (4-MA)
 4-Methylmethcathinone (4-MMC)
 3-Methylmethamphetamine (3-MMA)
 3-Methoxymethamphetamine (MMMA)
 4-Methoxymethamphetamine (PMMA)
 4-Fluoromethamphetamine (4-FMA)

References 

Methamphetamines
Entactogens and empathogens
Serotonin-norepinephrine-dopamine releasing agents